FK Mačva Šabac is a professional football club based in Šabac, Serbia.

Managers

References

External links
 

 
Macva Sabac